Santimamiñe cave, Kortezubi, Biscay, Basque Country, Spain, is one of the most important archaeological sites of the Basque Country, including a nearly complete sequence from the Middle Paleolithic to the Iron Age.

Its complete sequence includes the following cultures:
 Mousterian
 Chatelperronian
 Aurignacian
 Gravettian
 Solutrean
 Magdalenian
 Azilian

Plus unclassified remains of the Neolithic, Chalcolithic, Bronze and Iron ages.

It is best known for its mural paintings of the Magdalenian period, depicting bisons, horses, goats and deer.

Its excellent location over the Urdaibai estuary was probably most important in its continued habitation, first by Neanderthals and later by Homo sapiens.

Since 2008, it is one of the caves included as a World Heritage Site within "Cave of Altamira and Paleolithic Cave Art of Northern Spain".

References

See also
 Art of the Upper Paleolithic
 List of Stone Age art

Landforms of the Basque Country (autonomous community)
Caves containing pictograms in Spain
Art of the Upper Paleolithic
Neanderthal sites
Azilian
Mousterian
Cave of Altamira and Paleolithic Cave Art of Northern Spain